André Capelle (13 November 1891 – 30 January 1972) was a French cyclist. He competed in two events at the 1912 Summer Olympics.

References

External links
 

1891 births
1972 deaths
French male cyclists
Olympic cyclists of France
Cyclists at the 1912 Summer Olympics
Cyclists from Paris